John Elliott  (October 26, 1944 – November 11, 2010) was an American college and Professional Football defensive tackle.  He played collegiately for the University of Texas, and in 1967 was drafted by the American Football League's New York Jets.  As a rookie, he started for the Jets in their defeat of the Oakland Raiders in the 1968 AFL Championship Game, and then in the third AFL-NFL World Championship Game, helping them defeat the heavily favored Baltimore Colts in one of the AFL's greatest games.  He played for the AFL's Jets through 1969, and then for the National Football League Jets from 1970 through 1973. Elliott played for the New York Stars of the World Football League in 1974. John Elliott died of cancer at MD Anderson Hospital in Houston on November 11, 2010.

See also
 List of American Football League players

References

1944 births
2010 deaths
American football defensive tackles
Charlotte Hornets (WFL) players
New York Jets players
New York Stars players
Texas Longhorns football players
American Football League All-Star players
American Conference Pro Bowl players
People from Beaumont, Texas
Deaths from cancer in Texas
American Football League players